The thin snake eel (Ophichthus apachus) is an eel in the family Ophichthidae. It was described by John E. McCosker and Richard Heinrich Rosenblatt in 1998. It is a marine, tropical eel known from the eastern central and southeastern Pacific Ocean, including Mexico and Colombia.

The species epithet apachus, meaning "without thickness" in Greek, refers to the eel's thin frame. Due to the extremely minimal number of known specimens, and insufficient statistical data derived from them, the IUCN Redlist currently lists the thin snake eel as Data Deficient.

References

Taxa named by John E. McCosker
Taxa named by Richard Heinrich Rosenblatt
Fish described in 1998
Ophichthus
Fish of the Pacific Ocean